

Events

Year overall
 Due to weak sales numbers from 1978, during the course of the year Marvel Comics cancels a number of ongoing titles: Black Panther; Captain Marvel; Godzilla, King of the Monsters;  Howard the Duck;  The Human Fly; The Invaders; John Carter, Warlord of Mars; Kid Colt Outlaw;  Marvel Triple Action; and Rawhide Kid.
 The "Demon in a Bottle" storyline, by David Michelinie, Bob Layton, and John Romita, Jr., runs through Iron Man (issues #120–128, March–November).
 Alien: The Illustrated Story, a comics adaptation of Alien, by Archie Goodwin and Walt Simonson, published by Heavy Metal.
 In Turnhout, Belgium the first edition of the Stripgids Festival is organized by Jan Smet.

January 
 January 6: The first episode of Pat Mills and Joe Colquhoun's Charley's War is prepublished in Battle Picture Weekly and will run until October 1986. 
 January 17: In Il Male, the demented space adventurer Joe Galaxy makes his debut in a two-strip story (Joe Galassia e le perfide Lucertole di Callisto IV) by Massimo Mattioli.
 January 24: In issue #330 The Mighty World of Marvel, changes its name to Marvel Comic. (Marvel UK)
 January 28: In Il giornalino, Una tequila señor by Giuliano Longhi and Renato Polese marks the debut of the West Angels, a trio of easy-going bounty-hunters.
 The final Asterix story written by René Goscinny, Asterix in Belgium, drawn by Albert Uderzo  is published. It also ran in Le Monde as a serial.

February 
 February 20: Kees Kousemaker and his wife Evelien publish Wordt Vervolgd. Stripleksikon der Lage Landen, the follow-up to their earlier comics encyclopaedia Strip voor Strip (1979).
 February 22: In Spirou, the first chapter of the Yoko Tsuno story La lumiere d’Ixo, by Roger Leloup, is published.
 February 26: In Pif Gadget, Les Robinsons de la Terre (The Planet Earth’s Robinson) by Roger Lécureux and Alfonso Font makes its debut.
 Firs issue of Cliff (Editoriale Corno), by Luciano Secchi; the series, a sort of italian version of Hulk, lasts just 16 numebrs.

March
 March 6: In Tintin, the first chapter of the Alix story L’ Enfant Grec (The Greek children) by Jacques Martin, is published.
 March 7: In the TV show SuperGulp, Bonvi's Marzolino Tarantola makes his debut.
 March 23 : In Tintin the first chapter of the Ric Hochet story Le Fantome de l’alchimiste (The alchimist’s ghost) by André-Paul Duchâteau and Tibet is published.
 March 28: Corrier Boy (the former Corriere dei ragazzi) changes its headline in Corrier Boy serie music and furtherly reduces the comics’ space.
 IPC Magazines launches Tornado, a short-lived weekly British comic published for 22 issues.
 The Human Fly, with issue #19, is cancelled by Marvel.
 In Metal hurlant, Exterminator 17, by Jean-Pierre Dionnet and Enki Bilal is first published.

April 
 April 9: The first episode of Vahan Shirvanian's No Comment is published.
 Kid Colt Outlaw (1949 series), with issue #225, canceled by Marvel.
 The reprint title Marvel Triple Action, with issue #47, is cancelled by Marvel.
 La nuit des rapaces (The raptors’ night), first Jeremiah’s album by Herman Huppen (published by Fleurus).
 First issue of the magazine Maxmagnus (Corno).

May
 May 5: David Sutherland introduces Dennis' pet pig Rasher in Dennis the Menace and Gnasher. 
 May 15: In Tintin, the first chapter of the Jonathan story Douniacha, il y a longtemps… (Douniacha, long time ago) by Cosey is published.
 May 19: A statue of Suske en Wiske, designed by René Rosseel, is revealed at the Antwerp Zoo.
Frank Miller takes over from Gene Colan as regular penciler on Daredevil with issue #158.
 Vince Colletta resigns as art director of DC Comics.
 Rawhide Kid, with issue #135, canceled by Marvel.
 Captain Marvel, with issue #62, cancelled by Marvel.
 Howard the Duck (vol. 1), with issue #31, canceled by Marvel.
 Black Panther, with issue #15, cancelled by Marvel.
 In Il mago, Piombo di mancia (Tip lead) by Vittorio Giardino; debut of the Bolognese private eye Sam Pezzo.

June 

 June 6: In Tintin, the first chapter of the Thorgal story Les Trois Vieillards du pays d'Aran (The three old men from Aran country), by Jean Van Hamme and Grzegorz Rosiński is published.
 June 17: The final episode of the weekly political-satirical gag comic spin-off of Jean Tabary's Iznogoud is printed in the Sunday newspaper Journal du Dimanche. 
 June 21: In Spirou, the first chapter of the Spirou & Fantasio story Des haricots partout by Jean Claude Fournier is published.
 First issue of Il Paperino d’oro (The golden Donald Duck), published by Mondadori; reprints of the classic stories by Carl Barks.
 In Alterlinus, La lunga notte (The long night), by Sergio Toppi, first episode of the series Sharaz-de, inspired by One Thousand and One Nights.
 In Super Goofy, The Day a Knight Was Born, by Del Connel and Pete Alvarado; debut of the Mighty Knight, Middle-age version of Super Goofy.
 Cico story, by Guido Nolitta and Gallieno Ferri; first album fully dedicated to the Zagor’s Mexican partner.
 In Italy, first issue of Storie blu (Blue stories, Ediperiodici), anthological magazine of sci-fi and erotic comics.

Summer
 DC Special Series #17 — DC Special Series returns after it had gone on hiatus in Fall 1978.

July
 World of Krypton – #1 of 3, by DC Comics. The first official limited series, this three-issue "mini-series" was originally slated for Showcase #104-106 to coincide with the premiere of Superman: The Movie. The storyline was rescheduled for Showcase #110-112 when the film's release date was delayed; but ultimately, Showcase was cancelled after issue #104. Finally, the material is revised and released as a limited series by Paul Kupperberg and Howard Chaykin.
 With issue #24, Marvel cancels Godzilla, King of the Monsters.
 La resa dei conti (The showndown), by Magnus, last episode of La compagnia della forca.
 In Marvel Two-in-one 53, the story arc Project Pegasus begins.
 July 25: Marvel UK publishes the final weekly issue (#352) of Marvel Comic.
 July 26: In the German magazine Zack, the parody Western series Silas Finn by the Italian authors Tiziano Sclavi and Giorgio Cavazzano is published.

August
 With issue #70, Marvel publishes the final issue of The Tomb of Dracula, ending writer Marv Wolfman and artist Gene Colan's uninterrupted six-year run on the title.
 In the story Mister No va alla guerra (Mr. No goes to war), by Guido Nolitta and Gallieno Ferri, the true name of the character (Jerry Drake) is revealed.
 In Pif Gadget, debut of two adventure series: Ayak, by Jean Ollivier and Eduardo Teixeira Coelho, set in the Klondike Gold rush, with an artic wolf as protagonist, and Marine fille de pirate (The pirate’s daughter) by Francois Corteggiani and Pierre Tranchand.
 August 19: in Topolino, Topolino e l’enigma di Mu, by Massimo De Vita; debut of Prof. Zachary Zapotec.
August 25: IPC Magazines merged two comic books 2000 AD and Starlord and Tornado into "2000 AD and Tornado".

September 
 September 17: Jaap Vegter receives the Stripschapprijs.
 All-Out War #1: a new war title in the Dollar Comics format is launched by DC Comics with a September/October cover date.
 The Best of DC #1: a reprint anthology title in the digest format is launched by DC Comics with a September/October cover date.
 "The Proteus Saga", by Chris Claremont and John Byrne, begins in Uncanny X-Men #125 (running through issue #128).
 Marvel Comic, with issue #353, becomes a monthly title and is renamed Marvel Superheroes. (Marvel UK)
 The Invaders, with issue #41, is cancelled by Marvel.
 The first edition of the Helsinki Comics Festival is organized in Helsinki, Finland.
 For Better or For Worse, by Lynn Johnston, debuts, distributed by Universal Press Syndicate.
 Calibro 45, by Ennio and Vladimiro Missaglia (Daim Press); first album of the short-lived western series Judas,

October
 October 1: Hergé's Tintin and Snowy receive a statue in Uccle.
 January 6: The final episode of Kees Stip and Nico Visscher's newspaper gag-a-day comic In de Wolken is published.
 October 6: In The Louisville Times, the first episode of Don Rosa’s Captain Kentucky is published.
 October 21: In Il giornalino, the first chapter of the Dino Battaglia’s comics adaptation of Gargantua and Pantagruel is published.
 Action Comics #500: 68-pages, "The Life Story of Superman," by Martin Pasko, Curt Swan, and Frank Chiaramonte.
 Star*Reach, with issue #18, publishes its final issue.
 Time Warp #1: a new science-fiction anthology in the Dollar Comics format is launched by DC Comics with an October/November cover date.
 With issue #28, Marvel cancels John Carter, Warlord of Mars.
 In the Argentine magazine El pendulo the first episode of the series Las puertitas del senor Lopez, by Carlos Trillo and Horacio Altuna is published.

December
 December 21: In VSD, the first chapter of Le magot des Dalton (The Daltons’ swag) by Morris and Vicq is published. Vicq succeeds the late Goscinny as Lucky Luke’s writer.
 The final issue of the Dutch adult comics magazine Gummi/De Ballooen is published.
 In Linus, the first strip of Sergio Staino’s Bobo appears.

Births

March
 March 27: Mia Ikumi, Japanese manga artist (Tokyo Mew Mew, Super Doll Licca-chan), (d. 2022).

November
 November 22: Jeremy Dale, American comics artist (G.I. Joe: A Real American Hero), (d. 2014).

Deaths

January
 January 8: Victor Hubinon, Belgian comics writer (Buck Danny, Redbeard), dies from a heart attack at the age of 59.

February
 February 9: Daniël Jansens, Belgian comics writer (Bessy, Lombok, Bakelandt, Kramikske), dies from a heart attack at the age of 47.
 February 15: Roy d'Ami, Italian comics writer, artist and founder of the Studio Creazioni d'Ami, passes away at age 55.
 February 22: John Coleman Burroughs, American illustrator and comics artist (John Carter of Mars, David Innes of Pellicudar), dies at age 65.

March
 March 24: Ole Lund Kirkegaard, Danish novelist and illustrator (Gummi Tarzan), freezes to death at age 38.

April
 April 29: Hardie Gramatky, American novelist, comics artist and animator (inked Mickey Mouse, ghosted Captain Kidd Jr. and Ella Cinders), dies at age 72.

June
 June 25: Dave Fleischer, American animator, film producer and director (Koko the Clown, Betty Boop, Popeye), dies of a stroke at age 84.

July
 July 4: Pagsilang Rey Isip, Filipino-American comics artist, painter, photographer and musician, passes away at age 68 from a heart attack.
 July 19: Paul Bransom, American comics artist, illustrator and painter (The Latest News from Bugville), dies at age 94.

August
 August 10: Emmerich Huber, German comics artist (Das Neueste von Onkel Jup, Hans und Lottchen, Meine Lustige Fibel, Die Himmelswerkstatt, Bei Tüddelwitt im Zwergenwald, Bilderbogen von Emmerich Huber, Familie Kindermann), illustrator and advertising artist, dies at age 75.
 August 15: Walter Berndt, American comics artist (Smitty), passes away at age 80.
 August 26: Mika Waltari, Finnish novelist and comics writer (wrote for Asmo Alho ), dies at age 70.

September
 September 12: Les Clark, American animator (Disney Studios), dies at age 71.
 September 20: Erich Gold, AKA Goltz, AKA Eric Peters, Austrian-American caricaturist, political cartoonist, comic writer and artist (Abbott & Costello comics, Elsie the Cow comics), dies at age 80. 
 September 26: Carl Grubert, American comics artist (The Berrys), dies at age 68.

October
 October 16: René Brantonne, French illustrator and comics artist, dies at age 76.
 October 30: Oscar Conti, aka Oski, Argentine cartoonist, caricaturist, animator and comics artist (Cascabel, The True History of the Indies), dies at age 65.

November 
 November 2: Walter Bell, British comics artist (continued Weary Willy and Tired Tim and Casey's Court, made celebrity comics for Film Fun), dies at age 86. 
 November 5:  Al Capp, American comics artist (Li'l Abner, Abbie an' Slats, Long Sam), dies at age 70.
 November 22: Hugh McNeill, British comics artist (Ping the Elastic Man, Pansy Potter, Winnie the Witch, Jack and Jill), passes away at age 68.
 November 23: Eugène Gire, French comics artist (Cap'tain Vir de Bor), dies at age 73.
 November 30: Dick Huemer, American animator (Disney Studios) and comics writer (The Adventures of Buck O'Rue, True Life Adventures ), passes away at age 81.

December
 December 20: Leslie Illingworth, British cartoonist and comics artist, dies at age 77.

Specific date unknown
 Garrett Price, American comics artist, cartoonist and illustrator (White Boy, later renamed Skull Valley), dies at age 81 or 82.
 Carlos Laffond, Spanish comics artist (Thierry Le Chevalier, illustrated L'Oncle Paul), dies at age 49 or 50.

Conventions 
 April 6–8: MiamiCon II (Holiday Inn, Miami, Florida) — first iteration of the show since 1975; guests include Stan Lee
 June: Comicon (Australia) (RMIT, Melbourne, Australia) — first Australian comic book convention
 June: Houstoncon (Houston, Texas) — guests include George Pérez and Walter Koenig
 June: World of Comics — guests include Jim Steranko
 June 7–10: D-Con '79 (Dallas, Texas) — Larry Lankford's revival of D-Con after a hiatus; antecedent to Lankford's later Dallas Fantasy Fair
 June 30–July 1: Comic Art Convention I (Statler Hilton Hotel, New York City)
 July 14–15: Comic Art Convention II (Philadelphia, Pennsylvania)
 July 20–22: Chicago Comicon (Pick-Congress Hotel, Chicago, Illinois) — special guests: Mike W. Barr and John Byrne; first year that Joe Sarno is not one of the show's organizers, leaving the duties to Larry Charet and Bob Weinberg
 August: Atlanta Fantasy Fair (Downtown Atlanta Sheraton, Atlanta, Georgia) — official guests include John Byrne, Dave Sim
 August: FantaCon '80 (The Egg convention center, Empire State Plaza, Albany, New York) — first annual Albany-area horror and comic book convention, hosted by FantaCo Enterprises publisher Thomas Skulan
 August 1–5: San Diego Comic-Con (Convention and Performing Arts Center and U.S. Grant Hotel, San Diego, California) — 6,000 attendees; official guests: Kelly Freas, Mike Jittlov, Harvey Kurtzman, Victor Moscoso, Nestor Redondo, Marshall Rogers, John Romita Sr., Mort Walker, Len Wein, and Marv Wolfman
 August 11–12: Comicon '79 (London) British Comic Art Convention 11 (Rembrandt Hotel, Thurloe Place, London) — sponsored by Valhalla Books of Ilford, and organized by Ian Starling, Neville Ferris, and Ian Knox; guests include Jim Starlin (guest of honor), Paul Neary, Dez Skinn
 August 31–September 2: Comicon '79 (Birmingham) U.K. Comic Art & Fantasy Convention (Hotel Metropole, National Exhibition Centre; Birmingham, England) — produced by Colin Campbell/Biytoo Books; guests include Jim Steranko (guest of honor), Marshall Rogers, Terry Austin, Paul Levitz, Howard Chaykin, Len Wein, Joe Staton, Dez Skinn, and Dave Gibbons; presentation of the Eagle Awards
 September: OrlandoCon (Orlando, Florida) — guests include Will Eisner, C. C. Beck, Bob Cummings, Kirby Grant, and Jack Rosen
 November 24–26: Creation '79 (Statler Hilton Hotel, New York City) — guests include Tom Savini; admission: $6/day
 December 15: "Christmas Con" (Philadelphia, Pennsylvania) — guests include Rick Marschall

Awards

Eagle Awards 
Presented in 1980 for comics published in 1979:
 Roll of Honor: Jack Kirby
 Favourite Writer: Chris Claremont
 Favourite Comicbook Artist: John Byrne
 Favourite Inker: Terry Austin
 Favourite Comic Book (Drama): Uncanny X-Men
 Favourite Comic Book (Humor): Howard the Duck, by Steve Gerber and Gene Colan
 Favourite New Comic Title: Howard the Duck
 Favorite Single Comic Book Story: "Demon in a Bottle," Iron Man #s 120–128, by David Michelinie, John Romita, Jr., and Bob Layton
 Favourite Continued Comic Story: X-Men #125-128, by Chris Claremont and John Byrne
 Best Comicbook Cover: The Avengers #185, by George Pérez
 Favourite Team: X-Men
 Favourite Character: Wolverine
 Favourite Supporting Character: Wolverine
 Favourite Villain: Magneto
 Character Most Worthy of Own Title: Warlock
 Favourite Title (UK): Starburst, edited by Dez Skinn

First issues by title

DC Comics 
The Best of DC — Digest size title
 Release: September /October

All-Out War — Dollar Comics title
 Release: September /October  Editor: Murray Boltinoff

Time Warp — Dollar Comics title
 Release: October /November  Editor: Jack C. Harris

Marvel Comics 
Amazing Adventures vol. 3
 Release: December. Reprinting the original X-Men title.

Doctor Who Magazine
 Release: October 11 by Marvel UK.

Hulk Comic
 Release: March 7 by Marvel UK. Editor: Dez Skinn.

Man-Thing vol. 2
 Release: November. Writer: Michael Fleisher. Artists: Jim Mooney and Bob Wiacek.

Marvel Spotlight vol. 2
 Release: July. Editor: Roger Stern.

Micronauts
 Release: January. Writer: Bill Mantlo. Artist: Michael Golden.

Rom: Spaceknight
 Release: December. Writer: Bill Mantlo. Artist: Sal Buscema.

Shogun Warriors
 Release: February. Writer: Doug Moench. Artist: Herb Trimpe.

Tales to Astonish vol. 2
 Release: December. Reprinting edited versions of the 1968 Sub-Mariner title.

Independent titles 
Battle of the Planets
 Release: June by Gold Key Comics. Writer: Gary Poole. Artist: Win Mortimer.

Best Buy Comics
Release February by Apex Novelties. Writers and Artists: Robert Crumb and Aline Kominsky

Starblazer
 Release: April by D. C. Thomson & Co. Ltd.

Initial appearances by character name

DC Comics 
 Blok, in Superboy and the Legion of Super-Heroes #253
 Carl Draper, in Superman #331
 Green Fury, in Super Friends #25
 Firebug, in Batman #318
 Lucius Fox, in Batman #307
 Maxie Zeus, in Detective Comics #483

Marvel Comics 
 El Aguila, in Power Man and Iron Fist #58
 Alpha Flight, in Uncanny X-Men #120
 Aurora
 Northstar
 Sasquatch
 Shaman
 Snowbird
 Black Cat, in The Amazing Spider-Man #194
 Dire Wraith, in Rom #1
 Followers of the Light, in Shogun Warriors #1
 Justin Hammer, in Iron Man #120
 H.E.R.B.I.E., in Fantastic Four #209
 Kroton (Cyberman), in Doctor Who Weekly #5 (Marvel UK)
 Cassandra Lang (as "Cassie Lang"), in Marvel Premiere #47
 Scott Lang, in The Avengers #181; as Ant-Man II in Marvel Premiere #47
 Lady Lotus, in Invaders #37
 Night Raven, in Hulk Comic #1 (Marvel UK)
 Quasar, in The Incredible Hulk #234
 Proteus, in Uncanny X-Men #125
 Rom, in Rom: Spaceknight #1
 Schizoid Man, in Spectacular Spider-Man #36
 Shadow King, in Uncanny X-Men #117 (January)
 Screaming Mimi, in Marvel Two-in-One #54
 Vampiro, in The Mighty Thor #290 (December)
 War Machine, in Iron Man #118
 Debra Whitman, in The Amazing Spider-Man #196
 Mariko Yashida, in Uncanny X-Men #118

Notes